{{Infobox album
| name       = Cannonball Adderley Quintet in Chicago
| type       = Album
| artist     = Cannonball Adderley
| cover      = Cannonball Adderley Quintet in Chicago.jpg
| alt        =
| released   = 1959
| recorded   = February 3, 1959
| venue      =
| studio     = Universal (Chicago)
| genre      = Jazz
| length     = 34:01
| label      = MercuryMG 20449
| producer   = Jack Tracy
| chronology = Cannonball Adderley
| prev_title = Blue Spring
| prev_year  = 1959
| next_title = Cannonball Takes Charge
| next_year  = 1959
| misc       = 
  {{Extra album cover
 | header  = Alternative cover
 | type    = Album
 | cover   = Cannonball & Coltrane.jpg
 | border  =
 | alt     =
 | caption = Cannonball & Coltrane (1964, LM 82009)}}
}}Cannonball Adderley Quintet in Chicago (later released as Cannonball & Coltrane in 1964, on Limelight) is an album by jazz saxophonist Cannonball Adderley, his final release on the Mercury label, featuring performances by Adderley with John Coltrane, Wynton Kelly, Paul Chambers and Jimmy Cobb.

With Bill Evans substituting for Wynton Kelly on most tracks, these musicians would record the classic album Kind of Blue (1959), with regular employer  Miles Davis, shortly after this session.

Reception and context
The AllMusic review by Scott Yanow awarded the album 4½ stars and states: "Altoist Cannonball Adderley and tenor saxophonist John Coltrane really push each other on these six selections... Coltrane's very serious sound is a striking contrast to the jubilant Adderley alto... With pianist Wynton Kelly, bassist Paul Chambers and drummer Jimmy Cobb playing up to their usual level, this gem is highly recommended". 
The Penguin Guide to Jazz awarded the album 3 stars asserting: "The session with Coltrane is really the Miles Davis band without Miles and it's a bit of good fun, both hornmen flexing their muscles on the blues and a ballad feature apiece".

Track listing 
 "Limehouse Blues" (Philip Braham, Douglas Furber) – 4:40
 "Stars Fell on Alabama" (Mitchell Parish, Frank Perkins) – 6:15
 "Wabash" (Adderley) – 5:46
 "Grand Central" (Coltrane) – 4:33
 "You're a Weaver of Dreams" (Jack Elliott, Victor Young) – 5:34
 "The Sleeper" (Coltrane) – 7:13

Personnel 
 Cannonball Adderley – alto saxophone (except on #5)
 John Coltrane – tenor saxophone (except on #2)
 Wynton Kelly – piano
 Paul Chambers – bass
 Jimmy Cobb – drums

References 

1959 albums
Mercury Records albums
Cannonball Adderley albums